Drachenbau Josef Guggenmos was a German aircraft manufacturer, specializing in designing and building competition flex-wing and rigid wing hang gliders. The company was based in Kaufbeuren.

The company founder, Josef Guggenmos, was a World Champion hang glider pilot. Guggenmos died on 25 December 2010 and, as a result, the company was wound-up.

Aircraft

References

External links
 
 Company website archives on Archive.org

Hang gliders
Defunct aircraft manufacturers of Germany